Rumi Numeral Symbols is a Unicode block containing numeric characters used in Fez, Morocco, and elsewhere in North Africa and the Iberian peninsula, between the tenth and seventeenth centuries.

History
The following Unicode-related documents record the purpose and process of defining specific characters in the Rumi Numeral Symbols block:

References 

Unicode blocks
Computer-related introductions in 2008
Fez, Morocco
Numerals
Science in Al-Andalus
Arabic-language computing